The Circé-class submarines consisted of a pair of submarines built for the French Navy during the first decade of the 20th century. One boat was sunk in a collision before the First World War and the other was torpedoed and sunk by a German submarine in the last year of the war.

Design and description
The Circé class were built as part of the French Navy's 1904 building program to a double-hull design by Maxime Laubeuf. The submarines displaced  surfaced and  submerged. Their crew numbered 2 officers and 20 enlisted men.

For surface running, the boats were powered by two German MAN  diesel engines, each driving one propeller shaft. When submerged each propeller was driven by a  electric motor.

The boats were armed with six external  torpedo launchers; four of these were fixed outwards at an angle of five degrees, two firing forward and two firing to the rear. The aft tubes were reversed in March 1911 so they too fired forward. The other launchers were a rotating pair of Drzewiecki drop collars in a single mount positioned on top of the hull at the stern. They could traverse 150 degrees to each side of the boat. A support for a  deck gun was ordered to be installed on 29 March 1911, but the gun itself was never fitted.

Ships

See also 
List of submarines of France

Notes

Bibliography

External links
French Submarines: 1863 - Now
Sous-marins Français 1863 -  (French)

 
Submarine classes
 
Ship classes of the French Navy